Mateo Marianov Stamatov (born 22 March 1999) is a Bulgarian professional footballer who plays for FC Orenburg. Although he predominantly plays as a left-back, he has also been deployed as a left winger.

Club career
Born in Pazardzhik, Stamatov moved with his family to Barcelona, Spain when he was an infant. At the age of 7 he joined a local team before joining Espanyol in 2011. Four years later he signed a professional contract with the team.

On 3 February 2019, Stamatov returned to Bulgaria and signed a contract with Septemvri Sofia. He made his professional debut in a league match against Ludogorets Razgrad on 16 March 2019. 

In August 2020, Stamatov joined Levski Sofia, signing a one-year contract.

In June 2021, Stamatov left Levski to join Russian side FC Orenburg.

Career statistics

Club

References

1999 births
Sportspeople from Pazardzhik
Living people
Bulgarian footballers
Bulgaria youth international footballers
Association football defenders
FC Septemvri Sofia players
UA Horta players
PFC Levski Sofia players
FC Orenburg players
First Professional Football League (Bulgaria) players
Tercera División players
Russian First League players
Russian Premier League players
Bulgarian expatriate footballers
Expatriate footballers in Spain
Bulgarian expatriate sportspeople in Spain
Expatriate footballers in Russia
Bulgarian expatriate sportspeople in Russia